The Braille pattern dots-123456 is a 6-dot braille cell with all six dots raised, or an 8-dot braille cell with both dots in the top three rows raised. It is represented by the Unicode code point U+283F, and in Braille ASCII with the equal sign.

Unified Braille

In unified international braille, the braille pattern dots-123456 is used to represent a voiced dental/alveolar fricative or aspirant, such as /ð/, /z/, or /dʰ/ when multiple letters correspond to these values, and is otherwise assigned as needed.

Table of unified braille values

Other braille

Braille pattern dots-123456 is also used for the tactile feature on Canadian banknotes.

Plus dots 7 and 8

Related to Braille pattern dots-123456 are Braille patterns 1234567, 1234568, and 12345678, which are used in 8-dot braille systems, such as Gardner-Salinas and Luxembourgish Braille.

Related 8-dot kantenji patterns

In the Japanese kantenji braille, the standard 8-dot Braille patterns 235678, 1235678, 2345678, and 12345678 are the patterns related to Braille pattern dots-123456, since the two additional dots of kantenji patterns 0123456, 1234567, and 01234567 are placed above the base 6-dot cell, instead of below, as in standard 8-dot braille.

Kantenji using braille patterns 235678, 1235678, 2345678, or 12345678

This listing includes kantenji using Braille pattern dots-123456 for all 6349 kanji found in JIS C 6226-1978.

  - 目

Variants and thematic compounds

  -  め/目 + selector 1  =  自
  -  め/目 + selector 3 + selector 3  =  睿
  -  め/目 + selector 4  =  面
  -  selector 1 + め/目  =  真
  -  selector 1 + selector 1 + め/目  =  眞
  -  selector 3 + め/目  =  乂
  -  selector 4 + め/目  =  牙
  -  selector 5 + め/目  =  黽
  -  selector 6 + め/目  =  弗
  -  比 + め/目  =  亀
  -  数 + め/目  =  百

Compounds of 目

  -  日 + め/目  =  冒
  -  し/巿 + め/目  =  帽
  -  へ/⺩ + 日 + め/目  =  瑁
  -  め/目 + 宿  =  見
  -  宿 + め/目  =  寛
  -  へ/⺩ + め/目  =  現
  -  龸 + め/目  =  覚
  -  龸 + 龸 + め/目  =  覺
  -  て/扌 + 龸 + め/目  =  撹
  -  ま/石 + め/目  =  親
  -  ね/示 + ま/石 + め/目  =  襯
  -  け/犬 + め/目  =  観
  -  け/犬 + け/犬 + め/目  =  觀
  -  心 + け/犬 + め/目  =  欟
  -  め/目 + り/分  =  窺
  -  め/目 + 仁/亻  =  覗
  -  ね/示 + め/目  =  視
  -  め/目 + す/発  =  覧
  -  て/扌 + め/目 + す/発  =  攬
  -  心 + め/目 + す/発  =  欖
  -  い/糹/#2 + め/目 + す/発  =  纜
  -  め/目 + め/目 + す/発  =  覽
  -  な/亻 + め/目 + 宿  =  俔
  -  ま/石 + め/目 + 宿  =  硯
  -  ち/竹 + め/目 + 宿  =  筧
  -  む/車 + め/目 + 宿  =  蜆
  -  龸 + め/目 + 宿  =  覓
  -  れ/口 + め/目 + 宿  =  覘
  -  仁/亻 + め/目 + 宿  =  覡
  -  ゆ/彳 + め/目 + 宿  =  覦
  -  と/戸 + め/目 + 宿  =  覩
  -  や/疒 + め/目 + 宿  =  覬
  -  き/木 + め/目 + 宿  =  覲
  -  め/目 + め/目 + 宿  =  靦
  -  め/目 + 宿 + む/車  =  覯
  -  め/目 + め/目 + 宿  =  靦
  -  ふ/女 + め/目  =  媚
  -  ろ/十 + め/目  =  直
  -  な/亻 + め/目  =  値
  -  ほ/方 + め/目  =  殖
  -  す/発 + め/目  =  置
  -  め/目 + き/木  =  植
  -  つ/土 + ろ/十 + め/目  =  埴
  -  る/忄 + ろ/十 + め/目  =  悳
  -  め/目 + ろ/十 + め/目  =  矗
  -  の/禾 + ろ/十 + め/目  =  稙
  -  ひ/辶 + め/目  =  遁
  -  き/木 + め/目  =  相
  -  ち/竹 + め/目  =  箱
  -  よ/广 + き/木 + め/目  =  廂
  -  に/氵 + き/木 + め/目  =  湘
  -  よ/广 + め/目  =  盾
  -  ゆ/彳 + め/目  =  循
  -  き/木 + よ/广 + め/目  =  楯
  -  そ/馬 + め/目  =  省
  -  う/宀/#3 + め/目  =  督
  -  め/目 + ゑ/訁  =  叡
  -  め/目 + る/忄  =  懸
  -  め/目 + て/扌  =  攫
  -  め/目 + ほ/方  =  盲
  -  め/目 + せ/食  =  眉
  -  や/疒 + め/目 + せ/食  =  嵋
  -  め/目 + か/金  =  看
  -  め/目 + ゐ/幺  =  県
  -  め/目 + め/目 + ゐ/幺  =  縣
  -  め/目 + ん/止  =  眠
  -  め/目 + う/宀/#3  =  眺
  -  め/目 + や/疒  =  眼
  -  め/目 + そ/馬  =  着
  -  め/目 + に/氵  =  睡
  -  め/目 + む/車  =  睦
  -  め/目 + こ/子  =  睨
  -  め/目 + 氷/氵  =  瞥
  -  め/目 + 龸  =  瞬
  -  め/目 + ろ/十  =  瞭
  -  め/目 + ま/石  =  瞳
  -  め/目 + 日  =  瞼
  -  め/目 + は/辶  =  瞽
  -  め/目 + と/戸  =  算
  -  日 + 宿 + め/目  =  冐
  -  う/宀/#3 + め/目 + う/宀/#3  =  鼎
  -  め/目 + 宿 + く/艹  =  瞿
  -  め/目 + い/糹/#2 + ゑ/訁  =  矍
  -  か/金 + め/目 + め/目  =  钁
  -  て/扌 + 宿 + め/目  =  攪
  -  に/氵 + 宿 + め/目  =  泪
  -  め/目 + 宿 + も/門  =  盻
  -  め/目 + 宿 + う/宀/#3  =  眄
  -  め/目 + ほ/方 + そ/馬  =  眇
  -  め/目 + 宿 + 龸  =  眈
  -  め/目 + き/木 + selector 4  =  眛
  -  め/目 + と/戸 + 仁/亻  =  眤
  -  め/目 + 宿 + 比  =  眥
  -  め/目 + 比 + selector 4  =  眦
  -  め/目 + 龸 + ゐ/幺  =  眩
  -  め/目 + 宿 + け/犬  =  眷
  -  め/目 + selector 5 + む/車  =  眸
  -  め/目 + ゆ/彳 + 宿  =  睇
  -  め/目 + 宿 + つ/土  =  睚
  -  め/目 + し/巿 + せ/食  =  睛
  -  め/目 + た/⽥ + さ/阝  =  睥
  -  め/目 + 宿 + ま/石  =  睫
  -  め/目 + と/戸 + 日  =  睹
  -  め/目 + 宿 + へ/⺩  =  瞎
  -  め/目 + 龸 + 日  =  瞑
  -  め/目 + 宿 + め/目  =  瞞
  -  め/目 + 宿 + め/目  =  瞞
  -  め/目 + 龸 + つ/土  =  瞠
  -  め/目 + み/耳 + 氷/氵  =  瞰
  -  め/目 + を/貝 + き/木  =  瞶
  -  め/目 + 龸 + selector 1  =  瞹
  -  め/目 + 宿 + 日  =  瞻
  -  め/目 + 宿 + そ/馬  =  矇
  -  め/目 + と/戸 + み/耳  =  矚
  -  心 + 龸 + め/目  =  苜
  -  め/目 + つ/土 + を/貝  =  覿
  -  め/目 + 宿 + い/糹/#2  =  雎

Compounds of 自

  -  れ/口 + め/目  =  嗅
  -  め/目 + 心  =  息
  -  火 + め/目 + 心  =  熄
  -  め/目 + け/犬  =  臭
  -  も/門 + め/目 + け/犬  =  闃
  -  め/目 + た/⽥  =  鼻
  -  れ/口 + め/目 + た/⽥  =  嚊
  -  ふ/女 + め/目 + た/⽥  =  嬶
  -  か/金 + め/目 + た/⽥  =  鼾

Compounds of 睿

  -  に/氵 + 龸 + め/目  =  濬

Compounds of 面

  -  に/氵 + め/目 + selector 4  =  湎
  -  い/糹/#2 + め/目 + selector 4  =  緬
  -  よ/广 + め/目 + selector 4  =  靨
  -  す/発 + め/目 + selector 4  =  麺
  -  め/目 + も/門 + selector 2  =  靤

Compounds of 真 and 眞

  -  る/忄 + め/目  =  慎
  -  る/忄 + る/忄 + め/目  =  愼
  -  か/金 + め/目  =  鎮
  -  か/金 + か/金 + め/目  =  鎭
  -  め/目 + お/頁  =  顛
  -  や/疒 + selector 1 + め/目  =  癲
  -  れ/口 + selector 1 + め/目  =  嗔
  -  つ/土 + selector 1 + め/目  =  填
  -  心 + selector 1 + め/目  =  槙
  -  め/目 + selector 1 + め/目  =  瞋
  -  め/目 + せ/食 + selector 1  =  鷆
  -  め/目 + 龸 + せ/食  =  鷏

Compounds of 乂

  -  心 + め/目  =  艾
  -  め/目 + ぬ/力  =  刈
  -  く/艹 + め/目 + ぬ/力  =  苅
  -  め/目 + ね/示  =  刹
  -  め/目 + し/巿  =  希
  -  れ/口 + め/目 + し/巿  =  唏
  -  日 + め/目 + し/巿  =  晞
  -  ん/止 + め/目 + し/巿  =  欷
  -  の/禾 + め/目 + し/巿  =  稀
  -  せ/食 + め/目 + し/巿  =  鯑
  -  め/目 + の/禾  =  殺
  -  め/目 + ⺼  =  肴
  -  に/氵 + め/目 + ⺼  =  淆
  -  囗 + め/目 + の/禾  =  弑
  -  め/目 + 龸 + ち/竹  =  爻
  -  め/目 + selector 5 + そ/馬  =  爼
  -  な/亻 + 宿 + め/目  =  爽

Compounds of 牙

  -  り/分 + め/目  =  穿
  -  く/艹 + め/目  =  芽
  -  え/訁 + め/目  =  訝
  -  め/目 + さ/阝  =  邪
  -  め/目 + い/糹/#2  =  雅
  -  れ/口 + selector 4 + め/目  =  呀
  -  氷/氵 + 宿 + め/目  =  冴
  -  め/目 + た/⽥ + selector 1  =  谺
  -  め/目 + 宿 + せ/食  =  鴉

Compounds of 黽

  -  い/糹/#2 + め/目  =  縄
  -  い/糹/#2 + い/糹/#2 + め/目  =  繩
  -  む/車 + め/目  =  蝿
  -  む/車 + 宿 + め/目  =  蠅
  -  の/禾 + 宿 + め/目  =  龝

Compounds of 弗

  -  氷/氵 + め/目  =  沸
  -  め/目 + を/貝  =  費
  -  仁/亻 + め/目  =  仏
  -  仁/亻 + 仁/亻 + め/目  =  佛
  -  て/扌 + め/目  =  払
  -  て/扌 + て/扌 + め/目  =  拂
  -  と/戸 + selector 6 + め/目  =  髴
  -  ゆ/彳 + 宿 + め/目  =  彿
  -  る/忄 + 宿 + め/目  =  怫
  -  け/犬 + 宿 + め/目  =  狒

Compounds of 亀

  -  の/禾 + 比 + め/目  =  穐
  -  比 + 比 + め/目  =  龜
  -  も/門 + 比 + め/目  =  鬮
  -  ほ/方 + 比 + め/目  =  鼇
  -  氷/氵 + 比 + め/目  =  鼈

Compounds of 百

  -  な/亻 + 数 + め/目  =  佰
  -  ゆ/彳 + 数 + め/目  =  弼
  -  心 + 数 + め/目  =  栢
  -  か/金 + 数 + め/目  =  瓸
  -  ま/石 + 数 + め/目  =  竡
  -  の/禾 + 数 + め/目  =  粨
  -  そ/馬 + 数 + め/目  =  貊
  -  さ/阝 + 数 + め/目  =  陌

Other compounds

  -  ゐ/幺 + め/目  =  綿
  -  心 + 宿 + め/目  =  棉
  -  ゐ/幺 + 宿 + め/目  =  緜
  -  か/金 + 宿 + め/目  =  錦
  -  囗 + め/目  =  爾
  -  に/氵 + に/氵 + め/目  =  滿
  -  に/氵 + め/目  =  満
  -  る/忄 + に/氵 + め/目  =  懣
  -  め/目 + へ/⺩  =  璽
  -  ゆ/彳 + 囗 + め/目  =  彌
  -  氷/氵 + 囗 + め/目  =  瀰
  -  に/氵 + 囗 + め/目  =  濔
  -  ね/示 + 囗 + め/目  =  禰
  -  み/耳 + 宿 + め/目  =  蹣
  -  れ/口 + 宿 + め/目  =  嚏
  -  れ/口 + う/宀/#3 + め/目  =  嚔
  -  そ/馬 + 宿 + め/目  =  牝
  -  ひ/辶 + 囗 + め/目  =  迩

Notes

Braille patterns